Second Alto Perú campaign (1812–1813): Manuel Belgrano led the Northern Army to victory in the Battles of Tucuman and Salta in the north of present-day Argentina. These cities have remained under the Argentine government ever since. Again, they were stopped in Upper Perú in the battles of Vilcapugio and Ayohuma (today's Bolivia). In order to prevent the Spanish from getting supplies or taking prisoners in the city of San Salvador de Jujuy, Belgrano ordered the evacuation of the people and the burning of anything else left behind. This is known as the Jujuy Exodus.

See also 
Argentine War of Independence

Campaigns of the Argentine War of Independence